Yamani or Al-Yamani may refer to:

Al-Yamani (Shiism), a pre-messianic figure in Shia Islamic eschatology
Ahmad al-Hasan al-Yamani, a Basra Shia Iraqi who in the 2000s claimed to be the messenger of the Imam Mahdi
Ahmed Zaki Yamani, Saudi Arabian politician and petroleum and mineral minister